Torrelavega (Cantabrian: Torlavega) is a municipality and important industrial and commercial hub in the single province Autonomous Community of Cantabria, northern Spain.

It is situated roughly 8 kilometres from the Cantabrian Coast and 27.5 kilometres from the capital of the Autonomous Community, Santander, half way between the Principality of Asturias  and the Basque Country. The rivers Saja and  flow through the city.

It is the capital of the comarca  (county, but with no administrative role) of Valle del Besaya which includes also composed of the municipalities of Suances, Polanco, Cartes, Los Corrales de Buelna, Cieza, Arenas de Iguña, Bárcena de Pie de Concha, Molledo, Anievas and San Felices de Buelna.

Its highest point is 606 metres and its lowest point is 12 metres.

Torrelavega is a regional center for industry and transport, and its weekly livestock fair is famous in Spain. Its stadium is known as El Malecon. The Cave of Altamira, famed for the prehistoric paintings found inside, is about 10 kilometers northwest of the city.

History

Torrelavega was founded at the end of the thirteenth century by Garci Lasso de la Vega I (the elder), Adelantado Mayor of the Kingdom of Castile in the name of King Alfonso XI of Castile.

Its current name is due to the contraction of the original eponym of "Torre de la Vega". The Castle or Tower of the Vega's was built by Leonor Lasso de la Vega, daughter of Garci Lasso de la Vega II, the younger, and mother of the Íñigo López de Mendoza, marqués de Santillana in order to administer the tax and privilege due in the family's territory.

The name of the comarca, Valle del Besaya is derived from the Astur-Leonese Bisalia, which in turn derives from the Celtic, Bis-salia (the second Salia or Saja) from the two rivers that flow through the city.

Torrelavega was an important agricultural hub in the Kingdom of Castile since medieval times. Continuous population growth and industrial development enabled Torrelavega to attain city status in 1895 from the Queen Regent Maria Christina of Bourbon, Princess of the Two Sicilies.

The city is home to the main seat of the Spanish anarcho-syndicalist labor union the Confederación Nacional del Trabajo.

Geography

Divisions
Barreda
Campuzano
Duález
Ganzo
La Montaña
Sierrapando
Tanos
Torrelavega (Metro)
Torres
Viérnoles

Neighborhoods within the Metropolitan Area

La Inmobiliaria
El Barrio de Sorravides
El Barrio Covadonga
La Nueva Ciudad
El Zapatón
El Poblado

Neighboring municipalities

North: Santillana del Mar, Suances and Polanco.
South: Los Corrales de Buelna and San Felices de Buelna.
East: Piélagos and Puente Viesgo.
West: Reocín and Cartes.

Notable people 
 Óscar Freire, spanish cyclist.
 Juanjo Cobo, spanish cyclist.
 Dani Sordo, Rally Driver.

Twin towns – sister cities
Torrelavega is twinned with:
 Louga, Senegal
 Old Havana, Cuba
 Rochefort, France
 Zug, Western Sahara

References

External links
Ayuntamiento de Torrelavega
 
 http://www.oviedo.es/index.php/es/la-ciudad/ciudades-hermanadas  Oviedo´s sister city is Torrevieja, not Torrelavega.

 http://www.eldiariomontanes.es/20110324/local/torrelavega-besaya/torrelavega-louga-hermanas-201103241319.html

 
Municipalities in Cantabria